Hiram Alfred "H. A." Cody (3 July 1872 – 9 February 1948) was
a Canadian clergyman and novelist. He published 25 books,
including a number of bestsellers.

Books
 The Frontiersman: A Tale of the Yukon (1910)
 The Fourth Watch (1911)
 The Long Patrol: A Tale of the Mounted Police (1912)
 The King's Arrow: A Tale of the United Empire Loyalists (1922)
 The Trail Of The Golden Horn (1923)
 The Master Revenge (1924)

References

External links
 
 
 
 Hiram Alfred Cody entry in The Canadian Encyclopedia
 Hiram Alfred Cody entry in The New Brunswick Literary Encyclopedia

1872 births
1948 deaths